Sakobi is a 1999 Nigerian fantasy film whereby a young man intends to use his daughter for rituals. It was directed and produced by Zeb Ejiro. The movie is also unique with Enya's music which is played especially during sacrifices.

Cast 
Saint Obi and Susan Patrick are the leading actors, also featuring in the movie include Tony Umez, Edith Ujay, Sunday Omobolanle and Zik Okafor.
Princess Akor as Sakobi's Mother
Emmanuel Frank as Sakobi's father
Susan Patrick as Sakobi
Dusty Edet as Native Doctor
Patience Oghre as Nene
Gloria Ogunjiofor as Dora Davies
Domitilla Oleka as mighty serpent
Tony Umez as Patrick

Plot 
A snake girl is to entice a man known as Francis into using his daughter for ritual. He faced the consequences of his actions with his wife.

Francis was introduced by Patrick, his friend to sakoba due to his desperation for wealth. Sakobi who belongs to the cult of kongodis and worshipped the goddess known as the Great queen told Francis to sacrifice his only daughter, Hope for rituals. Another condition stated by sakobi is that he marry him which made Francis abandon his family. In the end, the Goddess rejected the sacrifice of hope and cursed him with a short life, the snake girl sakoba swallowed Francis when he tried to appease the gods. This is after the native doctor vanished.

See also
 List of Nigerian films of 1999

References 

1999 films
English-language Nigerian films
Nigerian fantasy films